The Mayor of Kaikōura (formerly Kaikoura) officiates over the Kaikōura District of New Zealand's South Island. The district is administered by a district council.

The current mayor is Craig Mackle, who was elected in 2019.

The former mayor was Winston Gray, who had been the mayor of Kaikōura since 2010  and was in office during the 2016 Kaikōura earthquake and the subsequent recovery process.

List of mayors

References

Kaikoura
Politics of Canterbury, New Zealand
Kaikōura District
Kaikoura
Kaikoura